

Storms
Note:  indicates the name was retired after that usage in the respective basin

 Dadafy (1982) – passed about east of Mauritius, and it subsequently weakened.

 Daisy
 1958 – Category 4 hurricane that did not affect land.
 1962 (January) – struck Madagascar.
 1962 (September) – damage over $1.1 million (1962 USD) in New England and the Canadian Maritimes.
 1965 – re-designated from Cyclone Carol upon crossing from the Australian region.
 1972 –  caused some flooding near Brisbane.
 1994 – struck Madagascar.

 Dalila
 1995 – did not make landfall.
 2001 – passed directly over Socorro Island as a tropical storm.
 2007 – passed over Socorro Island.
 2013 – made some impact on the western shore of Mexico and then shifted westward out to sea.
 2019 – never threatened land.

 Dalilia
 1983 – never affected land.
 1989 – passed just south of the Hawaiian Islands.

 Damia (1982) – a powerful tropical cyclone not areas land.

 Damien
 1987 – a category 2 tropical cyclone near Western Australia.
 1999 – a Category 3 severe tropical cyclone (Australian scale), mostly stayed at sea.
 2020 – was the strongest cyclone to make landfall in the Western Australian coast since Cyclone Christine in 2013.

 Damienne (2000) – a weak tropical cyclone that reached the coast of Madagascar after the breakup of the circulation.

 Damrey
 2000 – first name used from the WMO and strongest storm in 2000.
 2005 – most powerful storm to affect Hainan in over 30 years.
 2012 – the strongest to affect the area north of the Yangtze River since 1949.
 2017 – a strong tropical cyclone that affected the Philippines and Vietnam during early November 2017.

 Dan
 1989 – the third of a series of tropical cyclones that impacted the Philippines and Vietnam in October 1989.
 1992 – came nowhere near land.
 1995 – did not affect land.
 1996 – did not affect land.
 1999 – the worst typhoon to hit Xiamen in 46 years, killing five and injuring over 100 in the city.

 Danae (1976) – struck Madagascar and then hit the east coast of Mozambique and South Africa in late January 1976.

 Danas
 2001 – struck Japan.
 2007 – high waves injured two people in Japan
 2013 – Category 4 typhoon, which struck the Ryukyu Islands and Japan
 2019 – the fifth named tropical cyclone of the 2019.

 Daniel
 1978 – a Category 3 hurricane that did not affect land.
 1982 – a Category 3 which reached Hawaii as a tropical depression and dissipated in the Alenuihaha Channel between Maui and the Big Island.
 1988 – did not make landfall.
 1994 – no reports of damage or casualties.
 2000 – a Category 3 hurricane that threatened Hawaii for a time while weakening.
 2006 – a powerful Category 4 hurricane that brought rain to Hawaii as a tropical depression.
 2012 – a Category 3 hurricane that did not affect land.
 2018 – a weak tropical storm that never threatened land.

 Daniella (1996) – a powerful Category 4 tropical cyclone that passed near Mauritius.

 Danielle
 1964 – crossed between Réunion and Mauritius, producing wind gusts of 219 km/h (136 mph) in the latter island.
 1980 – flooded the area of Beaumont-Port Arthur, Texas.
 1986  – caused light damage to the Windward Islands.
 1992 – caused light damage when it hit the Delmarva Peninsula.
 1998 – a long-lived storm that caused damage in the United Kingdom as an extratropical storm.
 2004 – churned in the eastern Atlantic Ocean and did not threaten land.
 2010 – a long-lived storm that existed over the open Atlantic and did not cause damage to land.
 2016 – earliest fourth-storm formation in the Atlantic Ocean since record-keeping began; made landfall in Veracruz, Mexico.
 2022 – a Category 1 hurricane that churned over the central Atlantic.

 Danitza (1979) – did not make landfall.

 Dany (1969) – caused 80 deaths in Madagascar, and 2 in Réunion.

 Danny
 1985 – caused widespread flooding in Louisiana, killing 3 and causing $12 million in damage.
 1991 – formed near Cape Verde islands but dissipated before threatening land.
 1997 – struck Louisiana and Alabama; tracked across the southeastern United States and ultimately affected parts of New England with rain and wind; killed nine and caused $100 million in damage (1997 USD).
 2003 – looped in open ocean, never threatened land.
 2009 – formed as a tropical storm east of the Bahamas, skipping depression status; later absorbed by a frontal system off the US east coast.
 2015 – a small category 3 hurricane that approached the Leeward Islands but dissipated before threatening land.
 2021 – formed shortly before making landfall in South Carolina.

 Dante
 2005 – approached Japan.
 2009 – triggered severe flooding and mudslides which killed 28 people on Luzon.
 2013 – impacted the Philippines and Japan. 
 2017 –  did not affect land.
 2021 – crossed the Philippines and later affected Taiwan.

 Daodo (1987) – did not make landfall.

 Daphne
1966 – a powerful tropical storm, affected Madagascar and Mozambique.
 1982 – a Category 2 tropical cyclone (Australian scale) that hit Australia.
 1991 – then crossed Australia to Indian Ocean.
 2012 – did not affect land.

 Darby
 1980 – did not affect land.
 1986 – remained at sea.
 1992 – a Category 3 hurricane, remained well offshore but caused minor damage in Mexico and California.
 1998 – a Category 3 hurricane, never affected land.
 2004 – a Category 3 hurricane, remnants affected the Hawaiian Islands.
 2010 – a Category 3 hurricane, dissipated off the coast of southern Mexico.
 2016 – a Category 3 hurricane, made landfall on the Island of Hawaii as a tropical storm.
 2022 – a Category 4 hurricane, churned in the open ocean and dissipated south of the Island of Hawaii.

 Darian (2022) – a severe Category 5 Australian scale tropical cyclone remained mostly offshore.

 David
 1976 – a Category 3 severe tropical cyclone (Australian scale) that made landfall in Queensland.
 1979 – The most intense tropical cyclone ever recorded to make landfall in Dominican Republic, and was the most destructive storm in Dominica until Hurricane Maria in 2017.
 1997 – Large swells from David caused beach erosion in Hawaii. Later, David affected Japan as a minimal typhoon, but never made landfall.
 2009 – whose remnants brought heavy rain to the islands of Mauritius and Réunion.
 2017 – brought hurricane-force gusts, rain and severe snowfall particularly to central Europe, creating blizzard conditions in some areas.

 Davilia (1992) – not did make landfall.

 Davina (1999) – a powerful tropical cyclone category 3 affected Mauritius.

 Daye (2018) – a weak tropical cyclone that affected the states of Odisha and Andhra Pradesh.

 Dean
 1980 – which struck Western Australia and caused substantial damage to Port Hedland.
 1983 – which struck the coast of Virginia, causing minor erosion and flooding.
 1989 – which passed over Bermuda, causing $10 million in damage and 16 injuries.
 1995 – which caused significant flooding damage to Chambers County, Texas, but 1 death.
 2001 – which caused $7.7 million in damage to Puerto Rico and minimal damage to the U.S. Virgin Islands.
 2007 – a Cape Verde hurricane that made landfall in the Yucatan Peninsula at Category 5 strength.

 Debbie
 1957 – Tropical storm that affected Florida.
 1965 – crossed the northeastern Yucatán Peninsula as a depression and dissipated offshore from Mississippi.
 1969 – Category 3 major hurricane that brushing Newfoundland.
 2003 – Category 3 severe tropical cyclone that made landfall in the Northern Territory.
 2017 – Category 4 severe tropical cyclone that made landfall in Queensland.

 Debby
 1967 – did not make landfall.
1982 – reached Category 4 strength, grazed Bermuda, and caused high winds at Cape Race, but no significant damage.
 1988 – reached hurricane strength just before landfall at Tuxpan, Mexico, killing ten, but remained a hurricane for only six hours and later became Tropical Depression 17-E in the Pacific.
 1994 – formed near and passed over Saint Lucia, later dissipated over Hispañola; nine deaths were reported, and flooding and mudslides on Saint Lucia were severe.
 2000 – was a disorganized storm that caused minor damage to the Leeward Islands and Puerto Rico, but actually helped relieve a severe Cuban drought.
 2006 – formed south of Cape Verde and dissipated in the Central Atlantic.
 2012 – formed near the Yucatán peninsula, made landfall in Florida and then became post-tropical near the Bahamas.
 2018 – formed in the open waters of the North Atlantic, did not affect land.

 Deborah (1975) – a powerful tropical cyclone that passed near Réunion and hit Madagascar.

 Debra
 1959 – a weak Category 1 hurricane that made its landfall in Texas.
 1963 – a Category 1 hurricane that never affected land.
 1978 – a short-lived tropical storm that caused minimal damages in Louisiana.
 1991 – a powerful tropical storm affected Mozambique and South Africa.

 Deidre (1973) – a powerful tropical cyclone stayed sea.

 Delia (1963) – a powerful tropical cyclone originated near Diego Garcia and moved southwestward, passing north of St. Brandon, east of Madagascar, and west of Réunion.

 Delinda (1973) – a powerful tropical cyclone stayed sea.

 Delphine (1969) – a week tropical storm affected Madagascar and Mozambique.

 Delifina (1986) – did not make landfall.

 Deling
 1966 – Southern Taiwan bore the brunt of Judy's impact; a U.S. Navy aircraft crashed in the storm
 1970 – an intense typhoon that caused heavy damages in Japan and South Korea
 1974 – a deadly and destructive typhoon that struck Japan and South Korea
 1978 – hit Vietnam as a tropical storm
 1982 – a short-lived storm east of Taiwan; considered a continuation of Tess by the Japan Meteorological Agency
 1986 – a Category 1 typhoon that hit Taiwan then passed off the coast of China and South Korea
 1990 – a long-living tropical storm that caused minor impacts in South Korea and the Russian Far East
 1994 – a short-lived depression off the Paracel Islands
 1998 – a Category 4 typhoon that stayed out at sea east of Japan, but brought heavy flooding to Honshu

 Delta
 1972 – formed and remained in the central Atlantic.
 2005 – formed in the eastern Atlantic and became extratropical just before it passed to the north of the Canary Islands.
 2020 – peaked as a powerful category 4 hurricane in the western Caribbean before making landfall as a category 2 hurricane in the Yucatán Peninsula and later in Louisiana.

 Denise
 1966 – passed north of Mauritius and then crossed over Réunion.
 1967 – weak tropical storm that never threatened land.
 1971 – Category 4 hurricane that remained in the open ocean.
 1975 – Category 4 hurricane that did not come near land.

 Dennis
 1981 –  a weak storm that made landfall in Cuba and then Florida, causing moderate damage.
 1987 – remained in the open ocean.
 1993 – never threatened land.
 1999, a Category 2 hurricane that grazed the Bahamas and stalled east of Outer Banks of North Carolina before making landfall there.
 2005 – a potent and damaging storm that made landfall in Cuba twice as a Category 4 hurricane and once in Florida as a Category 3.
 2020 – an intense storm that affected the Republic of Ireland, the United Kingdom, and Scandinavia.

 Dety (1990) – did not make landfall.

 Dessilia (1993) – a strong tropical storm affected Madagascar. 

 Diana
 1960 – Category 1 hurricane, brushed southern Baja California Peninsula. 
 1968 – remained over the open ocean.
 1972 – Category 2 hurricane, dissipated near the Hawaiian Islands.
 1976 – Category 2 hurricane, never threatened land.
 1978 – a Category 2 tropical cyclone (australian scale) that affected islands in the South Pacific
 1980 – did not make landfall.
 1984 – Category 4 hurricane, struck North Carolina.
 1990 – Category 2 hurricane, struck Yucatán and Veracruz, Mexico.

 Diane
 1955 – a Category 2 hurricane that caused heavy damage to New England.
 1960 – tropical storm that formed in the Mozambique Channel, after hitting Madagascar.
 2020 – Caused flooding in Madagascar.

 Dianmu
 2004 – a powerful typhoon that struck southeastern Japan during the 2004.
 2010 – made landfall on Japan; exiting the country within five hours heavy rains were reported throughout the islands.
 2016 – a weak tropical cyclone that struck Leizhou Peninsula, China and Northern Vietnam in mid August 2016.
 2021 – a weak tropical cyclone that caused considerable damage over parts of Mainland Southeast Asia during late-September 2021.

 Dinah
 1952 – a tropical cyclone that brought heavy damages to Japan, while leaving 65 fatalities and 70 to be missing, all in that country alone.
 1959 – a powerful category 5 typhoon that was moving towards the coast of Japan, later changing course before reaching the coast of the country.
 1965 – a powerful Category 5 typhoon that destroyed 5,000 homes in Taiwan.
 1967 (January) – an intense tropical cyclone that impacted the southern coasts of Queensland and New South Wales, causing floods and landslides in 1967.
 1967 (October) – struck the southern island of Kyūshū in Japan, killing thirty-seven people and resulting in ten others being reported as missing
 1974 – hit Luzon on the 10th as an 80 mph typhoon it continued northwestward, hit Hainan Island, crossed the Gulf of Tonkin, and dissipated over North Vietnam.
 1977 – brought heavy rain and flooding to Luzon that killed 54 people and left 11 others missing.
 1984 – did not affect land.
 1987 – the fourth typhoon to form during August 1987.

 Dingani (2023) – never threatened land.

 Dindo
 2004 – a May storm that reached Category 5 intensity and approached the Bicol Region.
 2008 – dud not make landfall.
 2012 – Macau, the storm caused minor roof damage.
 2016 – an erratic system that did many twists and turns in the open sea before hitting mainland Japan. 
 2020 - a storm that formed off the coast of Luzon in early August, and hit the People’s Republic of China.

 Doaza (1988) – struck eastern Madagascar near Île Sainte-Marie, and it quickly weakened over land.

 Dona (1989) – passing east of St. Brandon and later to the west of Rodrigues

 Ditra (1985) – passed just east of Rodrigues, bringing heavy rains.

 Dodong
 2003 – approached Taiwan.
 2007 – approached Taiwan.
 2011 – a weak but costly tropical storm that affected Philippines and the East China in early-June 2011.
 2015 – a Category 5 typhoon that affected the Philippines in May of 2015.
 2019 – affected Japan and was not recognized by the JTWC.

 Dog
 1950 – Category 4 Cape Verde hurricane causing severe damage in the Leeward Islands.
 1951 – Category 1 hurricane that made landfall in Saint Lucia.
 1952 – Strong tropical storm that did not affect land.

 Doksuri
 2012 – made landfall over Nanshui, Zhuhai, Guangdong, China.
 2017 – traversed the Northern Philippines and made landfall in Central Vietnam.

 Dolly
 1946 – made landfall in China's Zhejiang province.
 1953 – Category 1 hurricane that hit Puerto Rico.
 1954 – Category 1 hurricane that moved through the Atlantic, never affecting land.
 1965 – never impacted land.
 1968 – moved up the east coast of the United States but did not make landfall.
 1972 – developed off the coast of Madagascar that later grazed Réunion.
 1974 – did not strike land.
 1996 – made landfall at Quintana Roo, Mexico and again at Tamaulipas, Mexico.
 2002 – never threatened land.
 2008 – Category 2 hurricane that caused $1.5 billion in damage to Texas and Mexico.
 2014 – made landfall in Mexico.
 2020 – formed off the coast of the United States as a subtropical depression.

 Dolores
 1948 – Storm that dissipated off the coast of Japan: also named Eunice after Dolores was thought to have dissipated operationally.
 1966 – Category 1 hurricane that stayed out at sea.
 1970 – operationally thought to have reached tropical storm strength.
 1974 – made landfall in the vicinity of Acapulco.
 1979 – Category 3 hurricane that stayed out at sea.
 1985 – Category 3 hurricane that never affected land.
 1991 – did not make landfall.
 1997 – Category 1 hurricane that never affected land.
 2003 – short-lived storm that never threatened land.
 2009 – short-lived storm.
 2015 – Category 4 hurricane that brought record-breaking rain to Southern California.
 2021 – made landfall in Southwestern Mexico.

  Doloresse (1996) – heavy rainfall caused landslides, and the cyclone caused a shipwreck, killing 67 people on the island of Mohéli.

 Dolphin
 2008 – Category 2 typhoon that did not affect land.
 2015 — Category 5 super typhoon that churned though the open ocean.
 2020 – paralleled the southeastern coast of Japan, remained well offshore.

 Dominic
 1982 – made landfall near Cape Keerweer.
 2009 – a category 2 tropical cyclone (Australian Scale), hit Australia.

 Dominique (1970) – a powerful tropical cyclone, stayed sea.

 Domitile (1977) – a weak tropical storm affected Madagascar.

 Domeng
 2006 – struck China.
 2019 – passed through the Babuyan Islands.
 2014 – remained in the open ocean. 
 2018 – did not make landfall.
 2022 - threatening the Ryukyu Islands

 Domoina (1984) – in 1984 caused 100-year floods in South Africa and record rainfall in Swaziland.

 Don
 2011 – weak tropical storm that made landfall on southern Texas. 
 2017 – short-lived tropical storm that dissipated before reaching the Windward Islands.

 Donna
 1960 – was the strongest hurricane of the 1960 Atlantic hurricane season, and caused severe damage to the Lesser Antilles, the Greater Antilles, and the East Coast of the United States, especially Florida, in August–September.
 2017 – was the strongest off-season tropical cyclone in the Southern Hemisphere during the month of May.

 Donaline (1998) – a weak tropical storm not affected.

 Dora
 1947 – a category 4 typhoon, hit Philippines.
1956 – Tropical storm that caused 27 deaths in Mexico.
 1964 – Category 4 major hurricane, made landfall near St. Augustine, Florida, with winds of 110 mph (175 km/h).
 1964 – hit Australia.
 1971 – widespread structural damage was reported with power lines down and roofs removed.
 1979 – a tropical depression affected Madagascar.
 1981 – did not make landfall.
 1987 – did not make landfall.
 1993 – a powerful category 4 hurricane, did not make landfall.
 1999 – long-lived hurricane in the Eastern, Central, and Western Pacific basins; did not affect land.
 2005 – moved parallel to the Mexican coast near Acapulco.
 2007 – a Category 4 tropical cyclone, did not make landfall.
 2011 – moved parallel to the Mexican coast of Baja California Sur.
 2017 - moved parallel to the Mexican coast.
 
 Doreen
 1962 –a category 1 hurricane, made landfall Mexico.
 1964 – tropical disturbance that hit Madagascar.
 1965 – did not make landfall.
 1969 – did not make landfal. 
 1973 – did not make landfal. 
 1977 – considered the worst tropical cyclone to affect California in 32 years. The tenth tropical cyclone, fourth named storm, and second hurricane of the otherwise inactive 1977.
 Dorian
 2013 – strong tropical storm that degenerated into an open wave in the middle of the ocean; it organized into a tropical depression once again near the Bahamas, but dissipated shortly after. 
 2019 – a record-breaking Category 5 hurricane that made a devastating landfall on the Bahamas, and stalled on Grand Bahama for two days, before it turned north and significantly impacted the Southeast U.S. and Atlantic Canada. Regarded as the worst natural disaster to strike the Bahamas.

 Dorina (1995) – a powerful tropical cyclone that slightly affected Port Mathurin.
  Doris
 1945 –
 1950 – 
 1953 – 
 1958 – 
 1961 – did not make landfall.
 1964 – 
 1969 – 
 1975 – 

 Dorothee (1973) – produced a series of thunderstorms on Réunion while the storm passed to the southwest.

 Dorothy
 1966 - formed in July in the north Atlantic Ocean, remained away from land.
 1970 - Deadliest tropical storm of the season, caused 51 deaths, mostly in Martinique, while moving through the Lesser Antilles.
 1977 - formed near Bermuda and became extratropical near Newfoundland.

 Dot
 1955 – a category 1 typhoon, make landfall Japan.
 1959 – peaked as Category 4 hurricane prior to making landfall on Kauai, Hawaii.
 1961 – affected Iwo Jima.
 1964 – made landfall twice, affected the Philippines, Hong Kong and eastern China.
 1966 – affected the Ryūkyū Islands.
 1970 – formed northwest of Hawaii, peaked as a Category 1 hurricane; did not affect land.
 1973 – made landfall just east of Hong Kong on the Chinese mainland.
 1976 – scraped the coast of China near Shanghai before making landfall while dissipating on the Korean Peninsula.
 1979 – affected most of The Philippines.
 1983 – made landfall in China.
 1985 – made landfall in the Philippines, brushed the southern coast of Hainan, made second landfall in Vietnam.
 1989 – made landfall on Hainan, weakening before a third landfall in Vietnam.
 1990 – made landfalls in Taiwan and China.
 1993 – made landfall in the Philippines Turned away from Hainan at the last moment to make landfall on mainland China.

 Douglas
 1984 – strongest hurricane of the season.
 1990 – killed one person in Mexico, where it nearly made landfall.
 1996 – was Hurricane Cesar in the Atlantic, crossed Central America and became Hurricane Douglas.
 2002 – never threatened land.
 2008 – passed near Mexico, brought minor flooding to some areas.
 2014 – never threatened land.
 2020 – passed very close to Hawaii at hurricane strength

 Dovi
 1988 – a Category 2 tropical cyclone that passed near Vanuatu.
 2003 – a Category 5 severe tropical cyclone that affected the southern Cook Islands and Niue.
 2022 – a Category 4 severe tropical cyclone that passed through New Caledonia.

 Dujuan
 2003 – hit near Hong Kong.
 2008 – 
 2015 – A super typhoon which brought exceptionally strong winds to the Yaeyama Islands and Taiwan.
 2021 - A weak tropical storm which brought heavy rains and flooding to the Philippines on mid-February.

 Dulcinee (1977) – not did make landfall.

 Dumako (2022) – a weak tropical cyclone that caused moderate damage in Madagascar.

 Durian
 2001 – made landfall in China, killing 78.
 2006 – killed 1,497 people in the Philippines and Vietnam.

See also

Tropical cyclone
Tropical cyclone naming
European windstorm names
Atlantic hurricane season
List of Pacific hurricane seasons
South Atlantic tropical cyclone

References
General

 
 
 
 
 
 
 
 
 
 
 
 
 
 
 
 
 

 
 
 
 
 

D